Deafness has varying definitions in cultural and medical contexts. In medical contexts, the meaning of deafness is hearing loss that precludes a person from understanding spoken language, an audiological condition. In this context it is written with a lower case d. It later came to be used in a cultural context to refer to those who primarily communicate through sign language regardless of hearing ability, often capitalized as Deaf and referred to as "big D Deaf" in speech and sign. The two definitions overlap but are not identical, as hearing loss includes cases that are not severe enough to impact spoken language comprehension, while cultural Deafness includes hearing people who use sign language, such as children of deaf adults.

Medical context 
In a medical context, deafness is defined as a degree of hearing difference such that a person is unable to understand speech, even in the presence of amplification. In profound deafness, even the highest intensity sounds produced by an audiometer (an instrument used to measure hearing by producing pure tone sounds through a range of frequencies) may not be detected. In total deafness, no sounds at all, regardless of amplification or method of production, can be heard.

Neurologically, language is processed in the same areas of the brain whether one is deaf or hearing. The left hemisphere of the brain processes linguistic patterns whether by signed languages or by spoken languages.

Deafness can be broken down into four different types of hearing loss: conductive hearing loss, sensorineural hearing loss, mixed hearing loss, and auditory neuropathy spectrum disorder. All of these forms of hearing loss cause an impairment in a person's hearing where they are not able to hear sounds correctly. These different types of hearing loss occur in different parts of the ear, which make it difficult for the information being heard to get sent to the brain properly. To break it down even further, there are three different levels of hearing loss. According to the CDC, the first level is mild hearing loss. This is when someone is still able to hear noises, but it is more difficult to hear the softer sounds. The second level is moderate hearing loss and this is when someone can hear almost nothing when someone is talking to them at a normal volume. The next level is severe hearing loss. Severe hearing loss is when someone can not hear any sounds when they are being produced at a normal level and they can only hear minimum sounds that are being produced at a loud level. The final level is profound hearing loss, which is when someone is not able to hear any sounds except for very loud ones.

There are millions of people in the world who are living with deafness or hearing impairments. Survey of Income and Program Participation (SIPP) indicate that fewer than 1 in 20 Americans are currently deaf or hard of hearing.  There are a lot of solutions available for people with hearing impairments. Some examples of solutions would be blinking lights on different things like their phones, alarms, and things that are important to alert them. Cochlear implants are an option too. Cochlear implants are surgically placed devices that stimulate the cochlear nerve in order to help the person hear. A cochlear implant is used instead of hearing aids in order to help when someone has difficulties understanding speech.

Cultural context 

In a cultural context, Deaf culture refers to a tight-knit cultural group of people whose primary language is signed, and who practice social and cultural norms which are distinct from those of the surrounding hearing community. This community does not automatically include all those who are clinically or legally deaf, nor does it exclude every hearing person. According to Baker and Padden, it includes any person who "identifies him/herself as a member of the Deaf community, and other members accept that person as a part of the community", an example being children of deaf adults with normal hearing ability. It includes the set of social beliefs, behaviors, art, literary traditions, history, values, and shared institutions of communities that are influenced by deafness and which use sign languages as the main means of communication. Members of the Deaf community tend to view deafness as a difference in human experience rather than a disability or disease.

Many non-disabled people continue to assume that deaf people have no autonomy and fail to provide people with support beyond hearing aids, which is something that must be addressed. Different non-governmental organizations around the world have created programs towards closing the gap between deaf and non-disabled people in developing countries. The Quota International organization with headquarters in the United States provided immense educational support in the Philippines, where it started providing free education to deaf children in the Leganes Resource Center for the Deaf. The Sounds Seekers British organization also provided support by offering audiology maintenance technology, to better assist those who are deaf in hard-to-reach places. The Nippon Foundation also supports deaf students at Gallaudet University and the National Technical Institute for the Deaf, through sponsoring international scholarships programs to encourage students to become future leaders in the deaf community. The more aid these organizations give to the deaf people, the more opportunities and resources disabled people must speak up about their struggles and goals that they aim to achieve. When more people understand how to leverage their privilege for the marginalized groups in the community, then we can build a more inclusive and tolerant environment for the generations that are yet to come.

History 

The first known record of sign language in history comes from Plato's Cratylus, written in the fifth century BCE. In a dialogue on the "correctness of names", Socrates says, "Suppose that we had no voice or tongue, and wanted to communicate with one another, should we not, like the deaf and dumb, make signs with the hands and head and the rest of the body?" His belief that deaf people possessed an innate intelligence for language put him at odds with his student Aristotle, who said, "Those who are born deaf all become senseless and incapable of reason," and that "it is impossible to reason without the ability to hear".

This pronouncement would reverberate through the ages and it was not until the 17th century when manual alphabets began to emerge, as did various treatises on deaf education, such as Reducción de las letras y arte para enseñar a hablar a los mudos ('Reduction of letters and art for teaching mute people to speak'), written by Juan Pablo Bonet in Madrid in 1620, and Didascalocophus, or, The deaf and dumb mans tutor, written by George Dalgarno in 1680.

In 1760, French philanthropic educator Charles-Michel de l'Épée opened the world's first free school for the deaf. The school won approval for government funding in 1791 and became known as the "Institution Nationale des Sourds-Muets à Paris." The school inspired the opening of what is today known as the American School for the Deaf, the oldest permanent school for the deaf in the United States, and indirectly, Gallaudet University, the world's first school for the advanced education of the deaf and hard of hearing, and to date, the only higher education institution in which all programs and services are specifically designed to accommodate deaf and hard of hearing students.

See also 
 Hearing loss
 Models of deafness
 Deaf culture
 Deaf education
 Deaf history
 History of sign language

References 

Deafness
Hearing loss
Audiology